C.S. Niranjan Kumar is an Indian politician. He is  Member of the Karnataka Legislative Assembly from the Gundlupet Assembly constituency, first elected in 2018. Kumar is associated with the Bharatiya Janata Party. 

Kumar was born on December 12th, 1973. He completed his Bachelor's dgree in Commerce. His wife is a homemaker, and they have one son.

References 

Karnataka MLAs 2018–2023
21st-century Indian politicians
Living people
1973 births